Chen Wencong (1970 in Singapore - 5 December 2012) was an Asian actor and was in contact with Mark Lee, Ann Kok, Lee Teng and Zheng Geping. Wencong once won the Best Variety Producer in 2011.

Personal life and death
Wencong was a Liverpool F.C. fan and died from leukaemia which he was diagnosed with in 2011.

References

1970 births
2012 deaths
Singaporean male actors
Deaths from leukemia
Deaths from pneumonia